Mount Bell may refer to:

 Mount Bell (Antarctica)
 Mount Bell (Alberta) in Alberta, Canada
 Mount Bell (California) in the Santa Monica Mountains of California, USA
 Mount Bell (New South Wales) in the Blue Mountains, Australia
 Mount Bell (Yukon) in the Yukon Territory of Canada